P. P. George (18 February 1919—24 January 1979) was a leader of the Communist Party of India and Member of the Legislative Assembly from Kottayam in 1977.

References

1919 births
1979 deaths
Communist Party of India politicians from Kerala